The 2022–23 Taça da Liga was the sixteenth edition of the Taça da Liga (also known as Allianz Cup for sponsorship reasons), a football league cup competition organised by the Liga Portuguesa de Futebol Profissional and contested exclusively by clubs competing in the top two professional tiers of Portuguese football – the Primeira Liga and the Liga Portugal 2.

This edition introduced a new format in which all teams entered the competition in a single group stage, with matches beginning on 17 November 2022 and played during the 2022 FIFA World Cup. The eight group winners advanced to a knockout phase comprising quarter-finals, semi-finals and the final, which was played at the Estádio Dr. Magalhães Pessoa in Leiria on 28 January 2023.

Sporting CP were the holders and four-time winners, after defeating Benfica 2–1 in the 2022 final. They reached their third consecutive final but were defeated 2–0 by Porto, who secured their first title in the competition after losing four previous finals.

Group stage
All times are Western European Time (WET, UTC+0).

Group A

Group B

Group C

Group D

Group E

Group F

Group G

Group H

Knockout phase
All times are Western European Time (WET, UTC+0).

Bracket

Quarter-finals

Semi-finals

Final

References

External links
 Liga Portugal official website

Taça da Liga
Taca da Liga
Portugal